The 1979 NSL Cup was the third season of the NSL Cup, which was the main national association football knockout cup competition in Australia. All 14 NSL teams from around Australia entered the competition, as well as a further 18 from various state leagues around Australia.

Bracket

First round

Round of 16

Quarter-finals

Semi-finals

Final

References

NSL Cup
1979 in Australian soccer
NSL Cup seasons